Kaiten were a Japanese World War II suicide torpedo. 

Kaiten may also refer to:
 Kaiten, a rolling maneuver in the martial art of taijutsu
 Kaiten, a program for effecting Denial-of-service attacks
 Japanese warship Kaiten, flagship of the breakaway Japanese Republic of Ezo
 Kaiten-zushi, the Japanese term for sushi served from a conveyor belt